Phrynonax poecilonotus is a species of nonvenomous snake in the family Colubridae. The species is endemic to the New World.

Common names
P. poecilonotus is commonly known in Trinidad and Tobago as dos cocorite, in Brazil as papa-ovo, and in English as the puffing snake or the bird snake.

Geographic range
P. poecilonotus is found from Mexico through Central America to northern and central South America and Trinidad and Tobago.

Diet
P. poecilonotus apparently eats any terrestrial vertebrate small enough to handle and is well known as a predator of bird eggs (hence some of the common names).

Description
P. poecilonotus is one of the most variable snakes in the world. For about the first year of their life, they look very dull in color, and even look all the same upon hatching. for the first four years of their life, the snake's appearance will change rapidly, from slate grey and yellow, to slate and orange, etc. Past the first four years of life, changes will be very slow, but they will change in appearance. The snakes can be combinations of black with red, orange, yellow, and/or lavender, or slate and red, yellow, orange, and/or lavender.  However, when handled, their behavior is similar, and they will readily bite.

References

Further reading
Boulenger GA (1894). Catalogue of the Snakes in the British Museum (Natural History). Volume II., Containing the Conclusion of the Colubridæ Aglyphæ. London: Trustees of the British Museum (Natural History). (Taylor and Francis, printers). xi + 382 pp. + Plates I-XX. (Phrynonax pœcilonotus, new combination, p. 20).
Freiberg M (1982). Snakes of South America. Hong Kong: T.F.H. Publications. 189 pp. . (Pseustes poecilonotus, p. 108 + color photo on p. 151).
Günther A (1858). Catalogue of the Colubrine Snakes in the Collection of the British Museum. London: Trustees of the British Museum. (Taylor and Francis, printers). xvi + 281 pp. (Spilotes pœcilonotus, new species, pp. 100–101).
Jadin, Robert C.; Burbrink, Frank T.; Rivas, Gilson A.; Vitt, Laurie J.; Barrio-Amorós, César L.; Guralnick, Robert P. (2013). "Finding arboreal snakes in an evolutionary tree: phylogenetic placement and systematic revision of the Neotropical birdsnakes". Journal of Zoological Systematics and Evolutionary Research 52 (3): 257-264.

Colubrids
Fauna of the Amazon
Snakes of Central America
Snakes of South America
Reptiles of Belize
Reptiles of Brazil
Reptiles of Colombia
Reptiles of Costa Rica
Reptiles of Ecuador
Reptiles of French Guiana
Reptiles of Guatemala
Reptiles of Guyana
Reptiles of Honduras
Reptiles of Mexico
Reptiles of Nicaragua
Reptiles of Panama
Reptiles of Peru
Reptiles of Suriname
Reptiles of Trinidad and Tobago
Reptiles of Venezuela
Reptiles described in 1858
Taxa named by Albert Günther